Andy Fyfe (24 October 1913 – 27 January 1993) was a Scottish footballer who played as a left back. Fyfe began his career in the mid-1930s with Kilmarnock, making 48 Scottish Football League appearances and picking up a Scottish Cup runners-up medal in 1938. Fyfe joined Greenock Morton the following year and played for them during World War II and on the resumption of official competitions at the end of the conflict.

Nickname known as ‘Big Dirty Andy’

References

1913 births
1993 deaths
Scottish footballers
Scottish Football League players
Kilmarnock F.C. players
Greenock Morton F.C. players
Newton Stewart F.C. players
Association football fullbacks
Parkhead F.C. players
Scottish Junior Football Association players
People from Cambusnethan
Sportspeople from Wishaw
Footballers from North Lanarkshire